Frank Gordon Stronach was a Canadian politician, who served as mayor of London, Ontario from 1961 to 1968.

Stronach, a retired 26-year veteran of the Royal Canadian Mounted Police, was serving as police chief in the suburban London Township, which was slated for annexation into the city on January 1, 1961. He ran for mayor in the 1960 municipal election after being unable to negotiate a position with the London Police Service, into which the township force was to be amalgamated. He won over incumbent mayor Allan Johnston by a narrow margin of just 174 votes, triggering a recount which confirmed his victory.

Johnston ran against Stronach again in the 1962 municipal election, which Stronach won by a wider 4,900-vote margin. In the 1964 election, Stronach was returned over two candidates including a 21-year-old University of Western Ontario student; in the 1966 election, he won reelection to a three-year term by acclamation.

He ran as an Ontario Liberal Party candidate for London South in the 1967 provincial election, but lost to incumbent MPP John White.

He died in office on January 1, 1968, and was succeeded as mayor by Herbert McClure in a council vote on January 8.

References

Mayors of London, Ontario
1908 births
1968 deaths
British emigrants to Canada
Canadian police chiefs
Royal Canadian Mounted Police officers
Politicians from London
Ontario Liberal Party candidates in Ontario provincial elections